The Battle of Boston may refer to:
Another nickname for the Green Line Rivalry, a rivalry between the athletic teams of Boston College and Boston University
The Siege of Boston, one of the initial engagements of the American Revolutionary War